Five Go Off In A Caravan is the fifth book in the Famous Five series by the British author, Enid Blyton and published by Hodder and Stoughton. The book includes a circus boy character named Nobby, whose name was changed to Ned, when publisher Hodder Children's Books made extensive editorial revisions to the Famous Five series of books.

Plot
The Famous Five are holidaying at the family house of Julian, Dick and Anne. They befriend an orphaned circus boy, Ned, who is in a procession of horse-drawn circus caravans. This inspires George to suggest a caravanning holiday. Julian's parents assent and hire two caravans for the children. 

They travel to Merran Lake, where they are reacquainted with Ned and meet various animals. The Five camp on a hillside, much to the annoyance of Ned's guardian, Tiger Dan (called Uncle Dan by Ned), and an acrobat named Lou, who want them to leave. One of the caravans of the children is directly above the entrance to a network of caves, where Tiger Dan and Lou have hidden stolen valuables. Assisted by Ned, Timmy and a chimpanzee named Pongo, the four children manage to outwit the crooks. After the criminals are arrested, Nobby leaves the circus to live with a local farming couple and look after their horses.

Characters
George (a tomboy whose real name is Georgina)
Julian                          (a boy and is the oldest of the four)
Dick                            (a boy)
Anne                            (a girl and is the youngest of the four)
Timmy (Timothy)                 (a dog)

Family Members:
Uncle Quentin                   (father of George and uncle of Julian, Dick and Anne)
Aunt Fanny                      (mother of George and aunt of Julian, Dick and Anne)

Circus Members:
Nobby (a circus boy, renamed Ned by publishers in 21st century editions of the book)
Tiger Dan (the chief clown of the circus and Nobby's guardian)
Lou (an acrobat and friend of Tiger Dan)
Pongo (a chimpanzee)

References

External links

 

1946 British novels
1946 children's books
Famous Five novels
Hodder & Stoughton books